Li Fang-Kuei (Chinese: 李方桂, Cantonese: Lei5 Fong1 Gwai3 [lej˩˨ fɔŋ˦ gʷaj˧] , Mandarin: Lǐ Fāngguì [li˨ faŋ˦ gʷej˥˩]; 20 August 190221 August 1987) was a Chinese linguist known for his studies of the varieties of Chinese, his reconstructions of Old Chinese and Proto-Tai, and his documentation of Dene languages in North America.

Biography
Li's father Li Guangyu received his jinshi degree in 1880 and served in minor official posts in the late 19th to early 20th century.

Li was one of the first Chinese people to study linguistics outside China. Originally a student of medicine, he switched to linguistics when he went to the United States in 1924. He gained a BA in linguistics at the University of Michigan in 1926 after only two years of study. He then did graduate study under Edward Sapir at the University of Chicago, where he was Sapir's first graduate student. From Sapir he learned phonetics, field methods, and American Indian languages. Sapir also encouraged him to study East and Southeast Asian languages, leading to his work on Thai and Sino-Tibetan. Li was also a student of Leonard Bloomfield at this time, from whom Li learned Germanic linguistics and textual analysis. Li also studied Indo-European linguistics, especially Greek and Latin, from Carl Darling Buck at Chicago, and in 1928 Buck secured a 6-month fellowship at Harvard University for him, where he studied Sanskrit and Tibetan.

Li conducted field studies of American Indian languages. His first exposure to fieldwork was his study of the Mattole language of northern California. He received an MA in 1927 and a PhD in 1928. His dissertation Mattole: An Athabaskan Language was published in 1930. Following the completion of his PhD, in 1928-29 Li traveled to Europe with letters of recommendation from Franz Boas, and visited linguists there including Walter Simon. Li also spent 3 months in 1929 in the Northwest Territories of Canada, living on an island in the middle of the Mackenzie River conducting fieldwork on the Hare language.

After his fieldwork on Hare, in 1929 he returned to China and, along with Y.R. Chao and Luo Changpei, became a researcher at the Institute of History and Philology of the Academia Sinica (then located at Beijing). From this point on, he performed field studies of several Tai languages (including the Zhuang people's Longzhou and Wuming dialects), while at the same time conducting deep investigations into Old Chinese and Tibetan. Li's revisions of Bernhard Karlgren's reconstructions of Middle Chinese and Old Chinese were widely used by students of ancient Chinese from their publication in the 1970s until the late 1990s.

Li taught Chinese language and linguistics at Yale University in 1938–39, and after World War II taught at Harvard University from 1946-48. During the same period he was working on a dictionary at the Harvard-Yenching Institute, followed by another year teaching at Yale from 1948–49, where his students included Nicholas Bodman. In 1949, he became professor of Chinese at the University of Washington, where he taught from 1949 to 1969, after which he taught at the University of Hawaii until his retirement in 1974. In 1977 he published a comparative reconstruction of Tai languages, the result of more than forty years of research. He also worked at Academia Sinica, now in Taiwan, in 1973.

Li died in San Mateo County, California, survived by his wife Xu Ying and their daughter Lindy Li Mark, a professor of anthropology who taught at California State University, Hayward and the Chinese University of Hong Kong, as well as their son Peter Li and daughter Annie Li.

Tsinghua University, his alma mater, began to publish his complete works in 2005.

Selected works
Li Fang-Kuei (1933). "Certain Phonetic Influences of the Tibetan Prefixes upon the Root Initials". Bulletin of the Institute of History and Philology 6.2: 135–157.
--------- (1956a). "The Inscriptions of the Sino-Tibetan Treaty of 821–822". T'oung p'ao 44: 1–99.
 
--------- (1972), "Language and Dialects in China". Free China Review XXII, No. 5.
 
--------- (1979) "The Chinese Transcription of Tibetan Consonant Clusters". Bulletin of the Institute of History and Philology Academia Sinica 50: 231–240.
--------- and W. South Coblin (1987).  A study of the old Tibetan inscriptions. (Special publications 91.) Taipei: Academia Sinica.
  Interviews conducted by Ning-Ping Chan and Randy La Polla, with an Introduction by George Taylor.

See also
 Karlgren–Li reconstruction of Middle Chinese

References

Further reading
 Mah Feng-hua 馬逢華 (1988), "Daonian Li Fanggui xiansheng" 悼念李方桂先生 ("Remembering Mr. Li Fang-kuei"), in Zhuanji wenxue 25.2: 110–114.
 Xu Ying 徐櫻 (1994). Fanggui yu wo wushiwu nian 方桂與我五十五年 (Fang-kuei's Fifty-five Years with Me) (Beijing: Shangwu yinshuguan).

External links
Obituary by Ron and Suzanne Scollon, American Anthropologist, 1989, available through JSTOR
 Li Fang-Kuei (1902–1989), by R.J. LaPolla, in Encyclopedia of Language and Linguistics, 2nd Edition, Keith Brown (ed.), London: Elsevier, 2005, pp. 514–515. .
Fanggui Li Collection, at American Philosophical Society
"Professor Li Fang-kuei: a Personal Memoir" by Anne Yue-Hashimoto
Li Fang-Kuei Symposium
An interview with Li Fang-kuei
Li Fang-Kuei Society for Chinese Linguistics

1902 births
1987 deaths
Boxer Indemnity Scholarship recipients
Chinese emigrants to the United States
Educators from Guangdong
Linguists from China
Linguists from the United States
Linguists of Na-Dene languages
Linguists of Southeast Asian languages
Members of Academia Sinica
Taiwanese people from Guangdong
Tibetologists
University of Hawaiʻi faculty
University of Michigan alumni
University of Chicago faculty
University of Washington faculty
Yale University faculty
Writers from Guangzhou
Linguists of Chinese
20th-century linguists
Historical linguists
Linguists of Kra–Dai languages